Dominic Meade (1661–1730) was Archdeacon of Cloyne from 1687 until his death.

Meade was born in Ballintober, County Roscommon; educated at Trinity College, Dublin;  and ordained on 19 December 1686.

References

Archdeacons of Cloyne
1730 deaths
1661 births
18th-century Irish Anglican priests
17th-century Irish Anglican priests
People from County Roscommon